In mathematics, a system of parameters for a local Noetherian ring of Krull dimension d with maximal ideal m is a set of elements x1, ..., xd that satisfies any of the following equivalent conditions:
 m is a minimal prime over (x1, ..., xd).
 The radical of (x1, ..., xd) is m.
 Some power of m is contained in (x1, ..., xd).
 (x1, ..., xd) is m-primary.
Every local Noetherian ring admits a system of parameters.

It is not possible for fewer than d elements to generate an ideal whose radical is m because then the dimension of R would be less than d.

General references

References

Commutative algebra
Ideals (ring theory)